Fritz-Walter-Stadion is the home stadium of 1. FC Kaiserslautern and is located in the city of Kaiserslautern, Rhineland-Palatinate, Germany. It was one of the stadia used in the 2006 FIFA World Cup. It is named after Fritz Walter (1920–2002), who played for the Kaiserslautern club throughout his career and was captain of the Germany national football team that won the 1954 FIFA World Cup in the "Miracle of Bern". The stadium was built on the Betzenberg hill, hence its nickname "Betze", and was opened in 1920.

Renovation

In preparation for the 2006 FIFA World Cup, the stadium underwent a 76,5 million Euro renovation beginning in 2002 that added a media center and a new floodlight system. The capacity was also increased from 38,500, of which 18,600 were standing, to 49,850, of which 16,363 are standing.

2006 FIFA World Cup 
The stadium was one of the venues for the 2006 FIFA World Cup.

The following games were played at the stadium:

References

External links

 Fritz Walter Stadion, 1. FC Kaiserslautern Information and Image Gallery

Buildings and structures in Kaiserslautern
1. FC Kaiserslautern
2006 FIFA World Cup stadiums
Football venues in Germany
Sports venues in Rhineland-Palatinate
Sports venues completed in 1920
1920 establishments in Germany
UEFA Women's Championship final stadiums